Anatoly Terentyevich Matyukhin (born 27 December 1930) is a retired Soviet football defender. He spend most of his career with CSKA Kyiv and Desna Chernihiv the main club in Chernihiv.

Career
Anatoliy Matyukhinstarted his career in 1949 at the Dinamo Yerevan, where he played 15 matches. In 1950, he moved to Dynamo Kyiv until 1952 where he played 10 games and he scored 2 goals. In 1954 until 1958 he moved to CSKA Kyiv, a club in Kyiv where he played 135 and scored 8 goals. In 1959 until 1960 he played for Arsenal Kyiv, here he played 29 matches and scored 2 goals. In 1961 he moved to Desna Chernihiv, the main club in the city of Chernihiv where here he stayed until 1964. Here he played 111 and become also the captain of the club. Played as a central defender. Despite his short stature and low speed, he effectively resisted his rivals on the football field. He was distinguished by high dedication in the game. The Desna footballer of the 1960s Valery Kravchinsky recalled an episode that happened during a match with the SKF Sevastopol team: “We accept Sevastopol in Chernigov, and they cut his forehead, our captain. Tolya is taken out of the field, stitched, and his head is bandaged. And when they had already put him on a stretcher to carry the ambulance into the carriage, he suddenly jumps up, breaks out of the arms of the doctors who were trying to reason with him, and - on the field. And there is just a riding ball. And Matyukhin ... enters the fight, wins the fight on the second half”.

References

External links 
Profile on website 

1930 births
Soviet footballers
FC Dynamo Kyiv players
FC CSKA Kyiv players
FC Arsenal Kyiv players
FC Desna Chernihiv players
FC Desna Chernihiv captains
Living people
Association football midfielders
Association football defenders